FitzEmpress is a surname given to the offspring of Geoffrey Plantagenet and Empress Matilda, namely:

 Geoffrey FitzEmpress (1134–1158), Count of Nantes
 Henry FitzEmpress (1133–1189), King Henry II of England
 William FitzEmpress (1136–1164), Viscount of Dieppe

See also 

 Fitz